William Paul Quinn (10 April 1788–21 February 1873) was born in India and immigrated to the United States, where he became the fourth bishop of the African Methodist Episcopal Church, the first independent black denomination in the United States when founded in 1816 in Philadelphia, Pennsylvania. 

In 1836 Quinn was assigned as a missionary to what was known as the Northwest, specifically Indiana and Ohio, although he also traveled to Illinois and Missouri. He settled in Richmond, Indiana as his base, founding an AME Church there and several throughout these states. In 1844 he was elected as bishop and in 1849 as Senior Bishop of the church.

Early life and education
By his own account, Quinn was said to have been born in Calcutta, India to an Indian family. An 1851 affidavit said his mother was Egyptian and his father was Spanish, who were involved in the mahogany trade. He was introduced to Christianity by a Quaker missionary in India and went to England, where he took an English name. He immigrated to the United States as a young man by 1808 and became active with an AME Church in New Jersey. He was part of its founding as a denomination in 1816.

Religious career
Quinn came to the US by 1808, when he became involved in the AME Church in New Jersey. He was among the founders of the denomination in 1816, the first black independent denomination in the  United States. According to that account, he was ordained a deacon in 1818. His wife was Mary Jane Quinn. 

In 1836 Quinn was assigned as a missionary to the Northwest Territory, and traveled throughout Indiana and Ohio to plant congregations. He is also credited with helping found the Brooklyn AME Church in Brooklyn, Illinois. Now called the Quinn's Chapel AME Church, it is thought to be the earliest AME Church west of the Appalachian Mountains. Brooklyn was an early black village founded on the Mississippi River across from St. Louis, Missouri. 

Quinn settled with his wife in Richmond, Indiana, which he used as a base for his missionary work. Quinn became an elder in 1838. They founded the Bethel A.M.E. Church in Richmond, as well as similar churches in Dublin, Newport(now Fountain City), and Cambridge City, Indiana, and most of the AME churches in Ohio and Indiana.

On May 19, 1844, due to his success in planting churches in the Northwest, the General Conference of the church elected him a bishop. He became the Senior Bishop of the church in May 1849, serving until his death in Richmond on February 3, 1873. During that period, another 47 AME congregations were established from Pittsburgh, Pennsylvania to California.

Quinn was known for saying that the Divine Command theory should be accepted without question, because God could be seen as always doing the right thing; even if he doesn't appear to be doing the right thing, the end outcome will be good. "Everything God does is good in essence."

Quinn was buried at Earlham Cemetery in Richmond.

Legacy and honors
Paul Quinn College, the oldest historically black college in Texas, was named after him. It was founded in Austin, Texas in 1872 by AME Church members to educate freedmen and later moved to Waco, Texas. In 1991 Paul Quinn College moved to Dallas, Texas, where it remains today.

Notes

References
Nathan Aaseng, "Quinn, William Paul," African-American Religious Leaders, Revised Edition, A to Z of African Americans (New York: Facts On File, Inc., 2011)
Benjamin W. Arnett, In Memoriam: Funeral Services in Respect to the Memory of Rev. William Paul Quinn, Late Senior Bishop of the African M.E. Church, Held at Warren Chapel, Toledo, Ohio, March 9th, 1873 (Toledo: Published by Warren Chapel, 1873)
Tarunjit S. Butalia, and Dianne P. Small, Religion in Ohio: Profiles of Faith Communities (Athens, OH: Ohio University Press, 2004)
Tom Calarco and Cynthia Vogel, Places of the Underground Railroad: A Geographical Guide (Santa Barbara, CA: Greenwood, 2011) 
Dennis C. Dickerson, "African Methodist Episcopal Church," Encyclopedia of African-American Culture and History, Colin A. Palmer, ed., Vol. 1 (Detroit: Macmillan Reference, 2006)

External links
Candace Staten, "William Paul Quinn", Black Past

1788 births
1873 deaths
African Methodist Episcopal bishops
People from Richmond, Indiana
19th-century Methodist bishops
Burials at Earlham Cemetery, Richmond, Indiana
Indian emigrants to the United States